Young Savage Florida is a compilation CD of various alternative musicians created in 1996. As the title implies, each band or musician was somehow connected to the U.S. State of Florida, the most notable of which was former Badfinger drummer Mike Gibbins who spent the last years of his life in the state. 

Spurred by the Baskervils off their own self-published Baskervinyl Records, as well as three other labels,  each musician has two songs arranged in the same order, with exceptions of The Vodkats, Galea Escargot (billed simply as "Escargot"), and John Stephan. Liner notes include both real and fake biographies of each band.

Common themes on each track are primarily relevant to southern U.S. culture, including surfing, warm weather, highway travel, and early rock and roll. Two of the more interesting songs are a trashy cover of Neil Sedaka's song "Stupid Cupid," by The Vodkats (in an unintentional medley with the band's own "Kill the Keg"), and a song by Loco Siempre alleging that Jerry Lee Lewis secretly killed Elvis Presley during a drunken rampage.

Track listings
Baskervils – "Inspired"
The Hate Bombs – "Run and Hide"
Leonard Croon Band – "Gonna Run My Mopar All Over You"
Car Bomb Driver – "Electric Sheila"
The Surf Kings – "Walking Bristol Bridge"
The Lears – "Is This Her Day?"
Mike Gibbins – "Dream Harder (Ballad of the Red Coats)"
Rancid Polecats – "Peterbilt"
Edison Shine – "Modulator"
Vodkats – "Stupid Cupid / Kill the Keg"
Loco Siempre – "Hunk-a-Nookie"
Baskervils – "Mr. Wilson's Got the Bends Again"
The Hate Bombs – "1" Punch"
Leonard Croon Band – "Queen City"
Car Bomb Driver – "Chicks Don't Dig Me"
The Surf Kings – "Phantom of the Jetties"
The Lears – "Her Magic Smile"
Mike Gibbins – "Layaway"
Rancid Polecats – "BBBB...."
Edison Shine – "Suburban Compound"
Loco Siempre – "Tell the King The Killer's Here"
Escargot – "Shopping Mall Queen"
John Stephan – "Coffee Angel"

External links
[ Young Savage Florida (All-Music Guide)]

Regional music compilation albums
1996 compilation albums
Music of Florida
Alternative rock compilation albums
Indie rock compilation albums
Garage rock revival albums
Psychobilly compilation albums
Surf compilation albums
Punk rock compilation albums